In shipping, the designation A1 is a symbol used to denote quality of construction and material.  In the various shipping registers ships are classed and given a rating after an official examination, and assigned a classification mark, which appears in addition to other particulars in those shipping registers after the name of the ship.

See also

 Shipbuilding
 A1 at Lloyd's, a top classification in Lloyd's Register

References

External links
 An example of a shipping registry  including A1-rated ships (those listed "1" in the "Rate A." column)
 American Bureau of Shipping Notations and Symbols – 29 January 2015

Shipbuilding